The Pixar Story, directed by Leslie Iwerks, is a documentary of the history of Pixar Animation Studios. An early version of the film premiered at the Sonoma Film Festival in 2007, and it had a limited theatrical run later that year before it was picked up by the Starz cable network in the United States.

The film was released, outside North America, on DVD in summer 2008 as part of the "Ultimate Pixar Collection", a box set of Pixar films. It was then included as a special feature on the WALL-E special edition DVD and Blu-ray releases, which were launched on November 18, 2008, and again on its Criterion edition.

The film premiered on BBC Two in the United Kingdom.

Synopsis of the Movie
The success story of Pixar Animation Studios from the ground up.

Voice cast
 Steve Jobs – Principal Investor & co-founder of Pixar 
 John Lasseter – Pixar co-founder & visionary
 Tim Allen – Actor, voiced Buzz Lightyear
 Brad Bird – Director
 Edwin Catmull – First Chief Technical Officer
 Billy Crystal – Actor, voiced Mike in Monsters, Inc. and Monsters University
 Michael Eisner – Former CEO of The Walt Disney Company
 Tom Hanks – Actor, voiced Sheriff Woody
 Bob Iger – CEO of The Walt Disney Company
 George Lucas – Founder of Lucasfilm, Pixar's original foundation
 James Ford Murphy – Head of animation & director of Lava
 Diane Disney Miller – Daughter of Walt Disney and wife of former Disney CEO Ron Miller
 Marc Davis – animator
 Stacy Keach – Narrator

Reception
The film was given generally positive reviews, receiving an aggregated score of 86% from Rotten Tomatoes, based on 7 reviews.

See also
Waking Sleeping Beauty, a 2009 documentary film chronicling the history of Walt Disney Animation Studios.

References

External links
 
 
 

2007 films
2007 documentary films
American documentary films
Disney documentary films
Pixar
Films directed by Leslie Iwerks
Films scored by Jeff Beal
Documentary films about the cinema of the United States
Documentary films about animation
Walt Disney Pictures films
Films about Disney
2000s English-language films
2000s American films